In mathematical logic,  a proof calculus or a proof system is built to prove statements.

Overview
A proof system includes the components:
 Language: The set L of formulas admitted by the system, for example, propositional logic or first-order logic.
 Rules of inference: List of rules that can be employed to prove theorems from axioms and theorems.
 Axioms: Formulas in L assumed to be valid. All theorems are derived from axioms.

Usually a given proof calculus encompasses more than a single particular formal system, since many proof calculi are under-determined and can be used for radically different logics. For example, a paradigmatic case is the sequent calculus, which can be used to express the consequence relations of both intuitionistic logic and relevance logic. Thus, loosely speaking, a proof calculus is a template or design pattern, characterized by a certain style of formal inference, that may be specialized to produce specific formal systems, namely by specifying the actual inference rules for such a system. There is no consensus among logicians on how best to define the term.

Examples of proof calculi
The most widely known proof calculi are those classical calculi that are still in widespread use:
The class of Hilbert systems, of which the most famous example is the 1928 Hilbert–Ackermann system of first-order logic;
Gerhard Gentzen's calculus of natural deduction, which is the first formalism of structural proof theory, and which is the cornerstone of the formulae-as-types correspondence relating logic to functional programming;
Gentzen's sequent calculus, which is the most studied formalism of structural proof theory.

Many other proof calculi were, or might have been, seminal, but are not widely used today.

Aristotle's  syllogistic calculus, presented in the Organon, readily admits formalisation. There is still some modern interest in syllogisms, carried out under the aegis of term logic.
Gottlob Frege's two-dimensional notation of the Begriffsschrift (1879) is usually regarded as introducing the modern concept of quantifier to logic.
C.S. Peirce's existential graph easily might have been seminal, had history worked out differently.

Modern research in logic teems with rival proof calculi:
Several systems have been proposed that replace the usual textual syntax with some graphical syntax. proof nets and cirquent calculus are among such systems.
Recently, many logicians interested in structural proof theory have proposed calculi with deep inference, for instance display logic, hypersequents, the calculus of structures, and bunched implication.

See also 
 Propositional proof system
 Proof nets
 Cirquent calculus
 Calculus of structures
 Formal proof
 Method of analytic tableaux
 Resolution (logic)

References

Proof theory
Logical calculi